Kneese is a municipality in the south west of the Nordwestmecklenburg district, in the Federal State of  Mecklenburg-Vorpommern, Germany. The municipality is governed by the government office Gadebusch in the city Gadebusch.

Geography
The municipality Kneese is located close to the border of the Federal State of Schleswig-Holstein in the hilly regions between Gadebusch and the lake Schaalsee. The border line passes the Bernstorfer pond and the Niendorfer pond. Both ponds are part of the lake Schaalsees. The region around Kneese is part of the biosphere reserve Schaalsee which is certified by the UNESCO. In the south the municipality is bordered to the district Ludwigslust.

The villages Dutzow and Sandfeld are part of the municipality.

References

Nordwestmecklenburg